Hollywood movies refers to the cinema of United States of America. The Hollywood cinema industry plays an important role among the world movie making studios. It is the third largest film market in the world. Hollywood movies in the 21st century are sometimes called "New Hollywood". Starting from the 2000s, American movies began to earn more fans and contributed to the box office. Science fiction, fantasy films, and animated movies have been globally impacting the movie industry. Research shows that compared to 20th century, the value of the movies increased around by double. International advertising had a crucial role in making "New Hollywood" bigger, compared to 20th century. Most of the movies` box office numbers are increased by overseas viewers.

Academy Award for Best Picture 
The Academy Awards is also considered the most prestigious award within American cinema. In the current century, As of 2018 the Academy has given 17 best picture awards to drama movies and 1 to Chicago (2002 film) which is musical and crime film. Among the winners, the highest-grossing movie is The Lord of the Rings: The Return of the King with 1.12 billion dollars worldwide.

Adventure genre 

Adventure movies is the number 1 genre for earning the money. "Avatar" still stands in the first place since 2009, with its 2.8 billion US dollars in box office, is the world's highest-grossing film of all time. 72.7% of the numbers come from foreign gross and 27.3% is domestic gross. The rights are owned by "Fox Filmed Entertainment" and it was directed by James Cameron. It cost 237 million dollars to make the movie and it took 10 years to make. The movie won 88 awards and 3 of them were Academy Awards that included Best Achievement in Cinematography, Best Achievement in Visual Effects and Best Achievement in Art Direction.

It is "Star Wars: The Force Awakens"  standing in the second, the same genre. The movie is the highest-grossing movie in the saga, created by George Lucas and directed by J. J. Abrams. The Force Awakens is the 7th episode out of 9 since 1977 and the first of the last trilogy since 2015. The film series is currently owned by "LucasFilm, Ltd." and "The Walt Disney Company". The movie won 62 awards (5 Academy Awards). The cost of making it 253 million dollars. The gross was about 2 billion dollars worldwide: 45.3% was domestic and 53.7% was international.

Talking about Academy Awards in adventure genre, British-American The Lord of the Rings (film series) were created by J. R. R. Tolkien. It received 17 Oscars in total: 4 for "The Lord of the Rings: The Fellowship of the Ring", 2 for "The Lord of the Rings: The Two Towers" and 11 for "The Lord of the Rings: The Return of the King". The whole series` cost was 281 million dollars, and the box office numbers were about 2.9 billion dollars.

J. K. Rowling`s British-American Wizarding World movies are considered the 3rd highest earning series with 8.537 billion dollars (The Highest-grossing movie: "Harry Potter and the Deathly Hallows – Part 2"), but it never won an Academy Award. Animated feature films has played an important role for the grossing of Hollywood movies, as 7 of them has surpassed 1 billion dollars worldwide. The most successful of all is Frozen (2013 film) by The Walt Disney Company, with 1.272 billion dollars worldwide gross and 2 Academy Awards (Best Animated Feature Film of the Year, Best Achievement in Music Written for Motion Pictures, Original Song).

The other genres 
Action movies is the second most famous genre in North America in current century. Marvel Cinematic Universe has an important place in it. Totally 18 movies has been made, starting from Iron Man (2008 film) to Ant-Man and the Wasp, and the box office total is 17.527 billion dollars so far. The highest-grossing movie of this universe in Avengers: Infinity War, which is the 3rd movie in the series. The movie has more international gross, 1.368 billion dollars, and the remaining 6.788 comes from domestic viewers. It is expected that the sequel Avengers: Endgame will surpass that success, that will release on May 3, 2019.

Comedy is the 4th top grossing genre of current century. In this genre, The Hangover Part II is considered as the highest grossing comedy movie of 21st century. The Production Budget for the movie was 80 million dollars, and the worldwide box office numbers were 5.865 million dollars. The following genre is thriller. Inception by the director Christopher Nolan is the most successful Hollywood movie both in the worldwide box numbers (8.324 million dollars) and in number of Academy Awards (Best Achievement in Cinematography, Best Achievement in Sound Mixing, Best Achievement in Sound Editing and Best Achievement in Visual Effects).

Overall, 36 films have passed 1 billion dollars in the world, and 32 of them have been made in 21st century by cinema of United States. Wizarding World (Warner Bros. Pictures) and Middle-earth films (New Line Cinema and Warner Bros. Pictures) are considered as British-American.

References 

History of Hollywood, Los Angeles